is the 8th major label single released by Japanese idol Erina Mano, and her 11th overall. The single was released on 15 September 2010 on the Hachama label. The single was released in three different types: Limited Editions A and B, and a normal edition. Limited edition A came with a bonus DVD featuring the "making-of" video of the photography on the CD covers, limited edition B sported a different cover, and the first press of all three editions came with a serial number card with which to enter a draw for tickets to the single's release event. The Single V was released on 22 September.

Promotion
"Genkimono de Ikō!" was used in multiple commercial advertisements, directed by Yukihiko Tsutsumi, which were featured on the TV Asahi broadcasting network. The song was used to promote Nissin Foods, Hakusui's High Sour, and Luna Luna's women's medical website. These products are also featured in the "Director's Cut" version of the music video. The coupling track, "Uchi e Kaerō", was used as the theme song of Kaidan Shin Mimi Bukuro - Kaiki, a film  released on 4 September 2010 in which Mano starred.

Track listing

Music video
The music video for the titular song was directed by Yukihiko Tsutsumi. The director's cut version features Mano trying to encourage people through difficult times using a special drink called "Gekimono" ("energetic people"), with the help of "Genkimono man". Much of the video plays out in a comic style, with dialogue appearing in speech bubbles instead of being spoken, punctuated by energetic dance scenes.

Chart performance
The single peaked at #7 on the weekly Oricon singles charts with a reported total of 13,640 copies in its first week, charting for three weeks. It also reached a peak of #23 on the weekly Japanese Billboard "Hot 100", charting for two weeks. The Single V peaked at #90 on Oricon's weekly DVD charts, charting for two weeks.

Charts

External links
Official music video on YouTube
Director's Cut Ver. 1 on YouTube
Review: Genkimono de Ikō! / Erina Mano - Hhotexpress
Hachama profile (single) 
Hachama profile (single V) 
Hello! Project profile (single) 
Hello! Project profile (single V

References

Erina Mano songs
2010 singles
Japanese-language songs
2010 songs